MD3, MD 3 or MD-3 can mean:
Dätwyler MD-3 Swiss Trainer, a Swiss light aircraft
Flyitalia MD3 Rider, an Italian ultralight aircraft
Maryland's 3rd congressional district, a United States electoral region
Maryland Route 3, a United States highway
MD3 (file format)